Francisco Guillermo Ochoa Magaña (born 13 July 1985), commonly referred to as Memo, is a Mexican professional footballer who plays as a goalkeeper for  club Salernitana and the Mexico national team.

Ochoa made his senior level professional debut for Club América in 2004 in a Mexican league match against Monterrey. He won his first league title in 2005 and was the club's first-choice goalkeeper up until 2011, making over 200 appearances for América. That summer Ochoa was transferred to Ajaccio in France. He spent three seasons with the club until their relegation from Ligue 1. In 2014, Ochoa joined Málaga but failed to establish himself in the team. In July 2016, he joined Granada on a season-long loan. In July 2017, he joined Standard Liège. He returned to Club América in August 2019. 

A Mexican international since 2005, Ochoa received his first cap at age 20 in a friendly match against Hungary. Having been included in the squads for the 2006, 2010, 2014, 2018 and 2022 FIFA World Cup, Ochoa has gained international recognition for his consistency and big game performances in the competition over multiple iterations. He has also appeared at the 2013 and 2017 FIFA Confederations Cup, the 2004 Summer Olympics and 2020 Summer Olympics, the 2007 Copa América, the Copa América Centenario, the 2007, 2009, 2015, and 2019 CONCACAF Gold Cup, and was originally in the 2011 CONCACAF Gold Cup before being suspended from the competition due to false doping allegations. Ochoa is the most capped goalkeeper in the history of the national side, and currently sixth on the all-time list with 134 appearances.

Club career

América

Guillermo Ochoa made his debut with América during the Clausura 2004 tournament against Monterrey, being only 18 years old when called up by head coach Leo Beenhakker. Ochoa quickly demonstrated his skill and talent in goal, and the young goalkeeper was thrust into the spotlight to replace injured veteran Adolfo Ríos. He would then share the starting job with Ríos after he recovered from his aforementioned injury. At the conclusion of his first season, he won the Rookie of the Tournament award.

When the Apertura 2004 tournament began, Ochoa was thought to be the heir apparent to Ríos, who had retired. However, new head coach Oscar Ruggeri brought new goalkeepers with him, among them Argentine Sebastián Saja. Ruggeri's stay at the club was marred by controversy and unpopular decisions. He was fired after only six games into the season and Ochoa was soon reinstated by new coach Mario Carrillo. Thereafter, he started every game for Club América save for incidents involving injuries or national team duty. Under Carrillo, Ochoa won his first championship with América following the Clausura 2005 season. He also won the 2005 Campeón de Campeones and the 2006 CONCACAF Champions' Cup with América.

He won back-to-back Golden Glove awards for the 2006–07 season.

In October 2007, Ochoa was named in France Footballs list of candidates for the Ballon d'Or, being one of only three players named to not play in Europe.

Ochoa would start 2008 in impressive form, helping América win the InterLiga tournament with excellent performances, most notably in the group match against Monarcas Morelia, where he saved a late penalty kick, and América's 1–0 lead.

In the winter of 2010, there was much speculation by various sources in England as to where Ochoa would move to for the 2011–12 season. English newspaper Metro reported Manchester United were keen on signing Ochoa.

Ochoa's last season with América was the Clausura 2011, which ended with a quarter-final defeat to Monarcas Morelia.

Ajaccio
2011–12 season

On 4 July 2011, Ochoa signed a three-year contract, with an additional one-year option, with French club Ajaccio, recently promoted to Ligue 1. He played in his first two friendlies with Ajaccio against Bordeaux and Real Sociedad, losing 1–2 and 0–4 respectively.

Ochoa made his official club debut on 5 August 2011 against Toulouse, losing 0–2. On 18 and 21 December, Ajaccio won two games in a row, with Ochoa keeping two consecutive clean-sheets, his third clean-sheet in total of the season. Ochoa also contributed in 3–0 victory against Étoile Fréjus Saint-Raphaël in the Coupe de France. On 14 January 2012, he helped Ajaccio with a 2–1 victory over Auxerre, and on 21 January, he played against Valenciennes in a 2–1 victory which put Ajaccio out of the relegation zone since the start of the season. Ajaccio won its sixth game with Ochoa in a 2–1 home win against Dijon. For the last game of the season, Ajaccio needed a win against Toulouse to escape the relegation zone. Ochoa started and played 90 minutes against Toulouse and helped Ajaccio win 2–0 to stay in Ligue 1. Ochoa finished his first season with 8 cleansheets, 43 saves and 151 blocks. Unfortunately he also finished the Ligue 1 season with 59 goals conceded, making him—along with Caen goalkeeper Alexis Thébaux—the most scored-on keeper of the season. Regardless, the fans voted him as Player of the Season.

2012–13 season
On 1 July, Ajaccio club president Alain Orsoni announced Ochoa would stay for the 2012–13 season amidst rumoured interest from clubs such as Fenerbahçe and Sevilla, but neither the clubs nor Ochoa's manager could come to a solid agreement.

On 11 August, Ochoa started and played against Nice in a 1–0 away win for their first game and win for the season. On 19 August, Ochoa played in Ajaccio's 0–0 draw at home against Paris Saint-Germain, in which he played a big part by keeping a clean sheet. In the third match of the season, Ochoa played 60 minutes against Valenciennes in which he had to be substituted out due to a collision with a teammate. Ajaccio lost the match 0–3. Ochoa finished the season with 12 clean sheets. He was voted again by fans as Player of the Season.

2013–14 season
Ochoa started in Ajaccio's first game of the season on 11 August 2013 against Saint-Étienne. Ajaccio lost 0–1. On 18 August, Ochoa played all 90 minutes against Paris Saint-Germain at the Parc des Princes, with Ajaccio taking an early 1–0 advantage, though an Edinson Cavani goal in the 86th minute cost Ajaccio a famous victory, instead having to settle for a 1–1 draw. Ochoa's performance was praised, with many noting the Mexican had saved 12 of PSG's 39 total shots.

On 18 January 2014, Ochoa played his 100th match in Europe in Ajaccio's 0–2 away loss to Nice. Following a 1–2 defeat to Bastia on 20 April, Ajaccio were officially relegated to Ligue 2 after spending three years in the top flight. Ochoa played his final match with the club on 17 May in a 1–3 defeat to Saint-Étienne. After officially announcing his departure, the club bid farewell to Ochoa in an open letter on social media.

Málaga
2014–15 season
Ochoa signed a three-year contract with Spanish La Liga club Málaga on 1 August 2014. Despite having participation with the club during the pre-season, Ochoa had not made any league appearances, with Carlos Kameni being manager Javi Gracia's first-choice goalkeeper. On 3 December, Ochoa played his first competitive game for Málaga, in a 1–1 Copa del Rey draw against Deportivo de La Coruña. In the following league match against the same team, three days later, he was again back on the substitutes' bench.

By early November, media speculation linked Ochoa with a possible January transfer to Liverpool in a £4 million deal. Despite rumours continuing to flourish and Mexico manager Miguel Herrera expressing displeasure with his first-choice goalkeeper receiving limited playing time, no move had materialized by the end of the January transfer window, with Málaga expressing they were pleased to retain Ochoa, adding the player had been "a professional".

Ochoa was ranked seventh in the International Federation of Football History & Statistics' list of the world's best goalkeepers for 2014.

2015–16 season
On 5 March 2016, Ochoa made his debut in La Liga in Málaga's 3–3 draw with Deportivo La Coruña, replacing Carlos Kameni due to injury in the 36th minute. It was Ochoa's first league appearance in over a year.

Granada (loan)
On 22 July 2016, Granada announced they had acquired Ochoa on a season-long loan. He made his league debut on 20 August in a 1–1 draw against Villarreal. It was reported in April 2017 that Ochoa was set to be a free agent at the end of the 2016–17 season due to the expiry of his contract with Málaga.

On 13 May, Ochoa broke the record for the most goals conceded in a single La Liga season when he conceded his 79th and 80th goals in a loss to Osasuna. The record, set by Salamanca goalkeeper Ignacio Aizpurúa in 1995–96, had previously stood at 78 goals for a single campaign. However, Ochoa was also the goalkeeper with the most saves across the top five leagues in Europe with 162. He ultimately conceded 82 goals as Granada were relegated to the Segunda División, having only won four matches in the season.

Ochoa played every minute of Granada's season and was voted Player of the Season by the club's fans.

Standard Liège

On 9 July 2017, it was announced Belgian club Standard Liège had signed Ochoa from Malága on a two-year contract. He made his league debut on the 30th of the month in a 1–1 draw against KV Mechelen. He became the club's first choice for the goalkeeper position and in his first season played 38 out of 40 league games including playoffs.

The following season, Ochoa played in every league match with Standard, including eight matches in the Europa League, and he was named the club's Player of the Season. In May 2019, Ochoa suggested that he would leave Standard Liège.

Return to América

On 5 August 2019, Ochoa returned to Club América on a three-and-a-half year deal. Though details of the transfer were undisclosed, it was reported that Ochoa will be the highest-paid Mexican player in the Liga MX, earning US$4.4 million annually. He chose the number 6 jersey, as the numbers 1, 8, and 13 – numbers he has previously worn throughout his career – had already been registered. On 24 August, he played his first match for América since 2011 against Tigres UANL, which ended in a 1–1 draw. The team went on to reach the Apertura championship finals and faced Monterrey, with Ochoa playing in both legs and managing to save Stefan Medina's penalty kick in the subsequent shootout, though it was not enough to prevent Monterrey from winning 4–2 on penalty kicks, following a 3–3 draw on aggregate.

Prior to the start of the 2020–21 season, Ochoa switched his jersey number. On 29 August 2020, he wore the captain's armband for the first time since returning to Club América in their 2–1 victory over Atlético San Luis.

Following a 1–0 win against Querétaro on 24 August 2022, Ochoa became the goalkeeper with the most clean sheets in Club América's 105-year history, breaking the previous record of 110 held by Adrián Chávez.

Salernitana
On 23 December 2022, Ochoa signed for Italian Serie A club Salernitana, agreeing a contract until 30 June 2023 with a one-year extension option.

International career
2004–2010: Debut, 2006 and 2010 FIFA World Cups
Ochoa was included in the roster to participate at the 2004 Summer Olympics in Athens, Greece, but saw no playing time as the third-choice goalkeeper. He was also called up for the 2005 Gold Cup but received no playing time. On 14 December 2005, at age 20, Ochoa made his senior national team debut in a friendly match against Hungary, which Mexico won 2–0. Ochoa was called up by coach Ricardo La Volpe for the 2006 FIFA World Cup as the third-choice goalkeeper.

After the World Cup, newly appointed manager Hugo Sánchez called Ochoa into the national side as a deputy to Mexico's then-starting goalkeeper, Oswaldo Sánchez. Ochoa was a part of the squad which participated at the 2007 CONCACAF Gold Cup, appearing once in a group stage match against Cuba as Mexico finished runner-up to rivals the United States. He also played for Mexico at the Copa América that same summer, being praised for his performance in the 2–0 group stage victory over eventual-champions Brazil. He appeared in an additional group stage match against Chile in a scoreless draw and in the third-place match against Uruguay, winning 3–1.

He was named captain for the under-23 side that would participate at the Olympic qualifiers in order to participate at the 2008 Summer Olympics. Mexico failed to qualify following a group stage exit and Hugo Sánchez was let go as Mexico's head coach.

He made his 2010 World Cup qualification debut on 28 March 2009 against Costa Rica, eventually playing the majority of the qualification matches. Ochoa was included in Mexico's roster for the 2009 CONCACAF Gold Cup, where he started in every match. In the semi-final against Costa Rica, the game was taken into a penalty shoot-out following a 1–1 draw. Ochoa would block Costa Rica's third attempt during the shoot-out, winning the series 5–3 and winning the man of the match award. As Mexico won the final against the United States with a score of 5–0, he was subsequently included in the All-Tournament Team. Ochoa made the final 23-man cut for the 2010 World Cup, but was controversially named back-up goalkeeper to veteran Óscar Pérez by coach Javier Aguirre.

2011: Gold Cup, Doping allegations
During the 2011 CONCACAF Gold Cup, Ochoa—along with four other members of the Mexico national team—tested positive for the banned substance Clenbuterol and were withdrawn from the team's tournament squad. All players were later acquitted by the Mexican Football Federation and the results were blamed on contamination of meat, with the ingestion of clenbuterol considered non-intentional. However, the World Anti-Doping Agency (WADA) appealed to the Court of Arbitration for Sport to request a ban. On 12 October 2011, WADA withdrew the request after the full file was available for them.

2014 FIFA World Cup

On 9 May 2014, Ochoa was named in Mexico's 23-man squad for that year's World Cup. He started in Mexico's opening match against Cameroon on 13 June, which ended in a 1–0 victory. The match was Ochoa's debut in a World Cup, having been called up for the previous two tournaments but failing to appear in a match.

On 17 June, in the second group stage match against hosts Brazil, Ochoa made four notable saves, including one following a powerful header from Neymar that helped secure a 0–0 draw, immediately drawing comparisons to Gordon Banks' famed 1970 World Cup save against Pelé. Ochoa was named man of the match, earning praise from many, including Brazilian head coach Luiz Felipe Scolari. Ochoa himself commented on his performance, saying, "It was the match of my life. To do it in a World Cup, in front of all the fans, it's incredible."

Ochoa conceded one goal in the group stage, in the 3–1 victory against Croatia that qualified Mexico for the round-of-16. Ochoa started in Mexico's knock-out match against the Netherlands, in which he made several crucial saves to hold on to Mexico's 1–0 advantage. However, the Dutch ultimately won 2–1 through a penalty scored in the 91st minute. Ochoa's performance was praised, and he was named man of the match for a second time.

2017 FIFA Confederations Cup
Ochoa was included in the 2017 FIFA Confederations Cup roster. In Mexico's third place match against Portugal, Ochoa managed to contribute various crucial saves, additionally stopping Andre Silva's 17th-minute penalty kick attempt. Mexico lost 1–2 in overtime but he  won the man of the match award.

2018 FIFA World Cup

In May 2018, Ochoa was named in the squad for the 2018 World Cup. In Mexico's opener against Germany, Ochoa made a total of nine saves, notably pushing a goal-bound Toni Kroos free-kick onto the crossbar, and ultimately securing a clean sheet in the 1–0 victory. He went on to play in all four of Mexico's games, making a total of 25 saves, more than any other goalkeeper in the tournament with the exception of Belgium's Thibaut Courtois, who managed 27 saves in seven games.

2019 CONCACAF Gold Cup
Ochoa was included in Tata Martino's preliminary roster for the 2019 CONCACAF Gold Cup and was subsequently included in the final list. In the quarterfinal match against Costa Rica, Ochoa proved to be decisive as he contributed to various saves to send the game tied 1–1 game to a penalty shoot-out, where he also made the critical stop in the shootout to send Mexico to the semifinal. His contributions won him the man of the match award. As Mexico defeated the United States in the final, he was included in the tournament's Best XI along with winning the Golden Glove Award. His participation in the tournament was his fifth Gold Cup, thus holding the record for the Mexican with most Gold Cup appearances.

2020 Summer Olympics
Ochoa was called up by Jaime Lozano as one of three over-age reinforcements for the 2020 Summer Olympics in Tokyo, his second participation at the Olympic Games after 2004. He won the bronze medal with the Olympic team.

2022 FIFA World Cup
In November 2022, Ochoa was named in the squad for the 2022 World Cup. In Mexico's debut match against Poland, Ochoa saved a penalty from Robert Lewandowski resulting in a scoreless draw between the two sides.

Style of play
Karla Villegas Gamas of Bleacher Report has described him "proven to be a safe keeper, with confidence and leadership. Despite [then] being 28 years old, Ochoa knows how to organize the defense and push his teammates toward perfection; it's no wonder why he wore El Tri's captain armband last March [2013]. His experience is vast, and that is why he knows how to handle pressure. Paco Memo has played in some of the most important tournaments in world football, such as the Confederations Cup, Gold Cup and Copa America. Ochoa’s aerial game is enviable. He can catch a cross or a shot, but he can also deflect them with high dives with the top hand and punches. But those are not his only assets. His reflexes are so sharp that he can perform a collapse dive with one hand with ease, even if he has just rejected a shot. When the rivals made it past the defense, Ochoa knows how to work inside the box to cover his goal as much as possible by narrowing the angle."

Ochoa has cited Peter Schmeichel as an influence on his playing style.

Personal life
In 2005, Ochoa dated Mexican actress, singer and songwriter Dulce María. The pair split a year later. After his move to France, Ochoa began dating Mexican model Karla Mora. On 8 February 2013, Mora gave birth to a girl, Lucciana, in Corsica. The couple welcomed their second child, a son, on 1 April 2015, one day after Ochoa's national team teammate Andrés Guardado's son was born. They were married in Ibiza, Spain on 8 July 2017. The couple's second daughter was born in May 2019.

Ochoa plays internationally with shirt number 13, in reference to his birthday which is on 13 July.

He has appeared on the North American front cover of the FIFA games, FIFA 08 and FIFA 09.

Ochoa is a graduate of the Football Management Degree online program from the Johan Cruyff Institute.

On 19 July 2022, Ochoa received an offer from a former NFL kicker to help train Ochoa if he wanted to end his football career and be an NFL kicker.

Career statistics
Club

International

HonoursSan LuisPrimera División A: Apertura 2004AméricaMexican Primera División: Clausura 2005
Campeón de Campeones: 2005
CONCACAF Champions' Cup: 2006
InterLiga: 2008Standard LiègeBelgian Cup: 2017–18Mexico U23Olympic Bronze Medal: 2020MexicoCONCACAF Gold Cup: 2009, 2011, 2015, 2019Individual'
Mexican Primera División Best Rookie: 2003–04
Mexican Primera División Golden Glove: Apertura 2006, Clausura 2007
CONCACAF Gold Cup All-Tournament Team: 2009
Ajaccio Fan's Player of the Season: 2011–12, 2012–13
Ajaccio Player of the Month: August 2013, September 2013
Granada Fan's Player of the Season: 2016–17
Standard Liège Player of the Month: November 2017, October 2018, November 2018, February 2019, April 2019
Standard Liège Player of the Season: 2018–19
CONCACAF Gold Cup Golden Glove Award: 2019
CONCACAF Gold Cup Best XI: 2019
Liga MX All-Star: 2021
CONCACAF Champions League Golden Glove: 2021
CONCACAF Champions League Team of the Tournament: 2021

See also
List of footballers with 100 or more caps

References

External links

1985 births
Living people
Footballers from Guadalajara, Jalisco
Association football goalkeepers
Club América footballers
AC Ajaccio players
Málaga CF players
Granada CF footballers
Standard Liège players
U.S. Salernitana 1919 players
Liga MX players
Ascenso MX players
Ligue 1 players
La Liga players
Serie A players
Belgian Pro League players
Mexican expatriate footballers
Mexican footballers
Expatriate footballers in France
Mexican expatriate sportspeople in France
Expatriate footballers in Spain
Mexican expatriate sportspeople in Spain
Expatriate footballers in Belgium
Mexican expatriate sportspeople in Belgium
Expatriate footballers in Italy
Mexican expatriate sportspeople in Italy
Mexico international footballers
Footballers at the 2004 Summer Olympics
Olympic footballers of Mexico
2006 FIFA World Cup players
2007 CONCACAF Gold Cup players
2007 Copa América players
2009 CONCACAF Gold Cup players
2010 FIFA World Cup players
2011 CONCACAF Gold Cup players
2013 FIFA Confederations Cup players
2014 FIFA World Cup players
2015 CONCACAF Gold Cup players
Copa América Centenario players
2017 FIFA Confederations Cup players
2018 FIFA World Cup players
CONCACAF Gold Cup-winning players
FIFA Century Club
2019 CONCACAF Gold Cup players
Footballers at the 2020 Summer Olympics
Olympic medalists in football
Olympic bronze medalists for Mexico
Medalists at the 2020 Summer Olympics
2022 FIFA World Cup players
Mexican people of Basque descent